Derek Smethurst (born 24 October 1947, in Durban) is a retired South African soccer forward who played professionally in South Africa, England and the United States.

Biography
Born into a sporting family, both his father Norman and brother Peter played professionally. Smethurst spent time with three amateur teams, Glenwood, Berea Park and Addington, in his early career.  He began his professional career with Durban City F.C. In December 1968, he transferred to Chelsea F.C. He spent the remainder of the 1968–1969 and the entire 1969–1970 season with the Chelsea Reserves.  Despite missing a large part of the 1969–1970 season with an injury, Smethurst still compiled 20 goals in 42 games with the reserves.  He made his first team debut on 1 September 1970.  Smethurst was the first South African to win a European championship when Chelsea won the 1970–71 European Cup Winners' Cup.  He was the first foreign-born player to win a European championship in England.  Two games into the 1971–1972 season, Chelsea transferred Smethurst to Millwall F.C. for £35,000 at his request.  He spent four seasons with Millwall.   In 1975, Smethurst moved to the United States where he played for the newly established Tampa Bay Rowdies of the North American Soccer League, where he became their all-time leading goal scorer with 57 goals in 65 games and a NASL all star.  He was the captain of the Rowdies' 1976 indoor championship team. In 1978, he began the season with Tampa Bay, but in May 1978 at his own request, he was traded to the San Diego Sockers in exchange for Peter Andersen. He led the Tampa Bay Rowdies in goals scored for the three years he played with them.  The Sockers traded him in July 1978. In 1979, he signed with the Seattle Sounders.  He spent two outdoor seasons and one NASL indoor season with the Sounders before moving to the Memphis Americans for the 1981–1982 Major Indoor Soccer League season.  He scored a hat-trick for the Sounders in a home game against the Portland Timbers on 30 June 1979.  Smethurst scored 75 goals in just over 100 games in the NASL.  In the spring of 1982, he joined the Carolina Lightnin' of the American Soccer League, and after six games retired from outdoor football. He rejoined the Rowdies for the 1986–87 AISA season, appearing in a few home matches only. Smethurst's goal-scoring rate in professional first-team football was a goal for every 1.85 games.  Played in the "First" English League game to be played on a Sunday for Millwall v Fulham, 20 January 1974.

He also played in the 1977 NFL pre-season with the Tampa Bay Buccaneers as a placekicker wearing jersey #12.

Now an accomplished author and sports consultant, Smethurst lives in Valrico, Florida, and runs a professional soccer training academy.

Achievements

First African national to win a European Championship 
First South African to win a European Championship
First foreign-born player to win a European Championship in England
First foreign player to score for Chelsea in a European Championship
First foreign player to win a European Championship with Chelsea F.C.
First foreign player to play in a European Championship Final for Chelsea
First player to score 4 goals in one game for the Tampa Bay Rowdies – NASL
First Seattle Sounder to score 3 goals in one game – NASL
First Seattle Sounder to score 4 goals in one game – NASL
First and only South African to score 3 goals in a Currie Cup Final in South Africa.

References

External links
Iol.co.za; with story on Smethurst's interest to lead the Bafana Bafana for the 2010 World Cup
Valricoviper.net
NASL/MISL stats
 Tampa Bay Rowdies profile

1948 births
Living people
American Indoor Soccer Association players
American Soccer League (1933–1983) players
South African people of British descent
Association football forwards
American football placekickers
Carolina Lightnin' players
Chelsea F.C. players
Expatriate footballers in England
Expatriate soccer players in the United States
Footballers who switched code
Major Indoor Soccer League (1978–1992) players
Memphis Americans players
Millwall F.C. players
National Professional Soccer League (1984–2001) players
North American Soccer League (1968–1984) players
North American Soccer League (1968–1984) indoor players
South African players of American football
Sportspeople from Durban
San Diego Sockers (NASL) players
Seattle Sounders (1974–1983) players
South African soccer players
South African expatriate soccer players
Tampa Bay Buccaneers players
Tampa Bay Rowdies (1975–1993) players
White South African people
South African expatriate sportspeople in England
South African expatriate sportspeople in the United States
People from Valrico, Florida
Association football players that played in the NFL
National Football League (South Africa) players